The following is a list of most valuable players ( or ) in the Cuban National Series since its inception in 1961.

List

See also
Baseball awards#Cuba

Sources
 

MVPs
Baseball most valuable player awards
Most valuable player awards
Awards established in 1962
1962 establishments in Cuba